Lah-Lah's Adventures is a pre-school music television series. It went to air on 7TWO on 28 April 2014, for 26 episodes of 12 minutes. It also aired on CBeebies in Australia as well as on BBC Kids and Knowledge Network in Canada.

Lah-Lah's Adventures was produced by Stella Projects and Bardel Entertainment and distributed internationally by Bardel Entertainment.

Lah-Lah's Adventures marries live action and animation to create a mix of wonderful stories and age appropriate music for preschoolers. Each episode’s story takes the live action band on an engaging adventure around Lah-Lah Land, a magical world where anything is possible and music is everywhere.

Lah-Lah's Adventures showcases the live band, Lah-Lah, who introduce children to music and musical instruments.

Episodes
Season 1

01 - High Or Low For The Show
02 - Where's Mister Saxophone?
03 - Where's My Toothbrush?
04 - Shiny New Shoes
05 - Aah Choo!
06 - Five More Minutes
07 - Lah-Lah's New Dance
08 - We're A Family
09 - Music For Everyone
10 - Buzz's Writing Song
11 - Noisy Noisy Birds
12 - A Birthday Surprize
13 - Music Makes Me Feel So Good
14 - Boom Chaka
15 - Secret Band Business
16 - Brassy Babble
17 - Squeezy Visits The Dentist
18 - Mister Saxophone Loses His Groove
19 - Dancing Doll
20 - Parade Day
21 - Nothing To Sneeze About
22 - A Backwards Day
23 - Tom Tom's Tinkering
24 - I'm Not Sleepy
25 - Buzz Gets Braver
26 - Bad Hair Day

References

7two original programming
Australian children's television series
2014 Australian television series debuts
2014 Australian television series endings
Australian preschool education television series